Sibling Revelry: The Best of the Smothers Brothers is a compilation album released by Rhino Records in 1988.  A 1998 CD re-issue added "Cabbage", "Michael Row Your Boat Ashore" and "You Didn't Come In"/"Tommy's Song" as bonus tracks.  The album contains at least one track from each of their previous albums with the exception of The Smothers Brothers Play It Straight.

Track listing
"Pretoria" - originally released on The Smothers Brothers at the Purple Onion
"Tom Dooley" - originally released on The Smothers Brothers at the Purple Onion
"Chocolate" - originally released on The Two Sides of the Smothers Brothers
"Laredo" - originally released on The Two Sides of the Smothers Brothers
"Daniel Boone" - originally released on Think Ethnic
"The Saga of John Henry" - originally released on Think Ethnic
"Gnus" - originally released on Curb Your Tongue, Knave
"Crabs Walk Sideways" - originally released on It Must Have Been Something I Said!
"Jenny Brown" - originally released on It Must Have Been Something I Said!
"The Military Lovers" - originally released on Tour de Farce: American History and Other Unrelated Subjects
"Mediocre Fred" - originally released on Tour de Farce: American History and Other Unrelated Subjects
"Mom Always Liked You Best" - originally released on Mom Always Liked You Best!
"You Can Call Me Stupid" - originally released on Mom Always Liked You Best!
"I Talk to the Trees" - this version is from Golden Hits of the Smothers Brothers, Vol. 2
"Hangman" - another remade version from Golden Hits of the Smothers Brothers, Vol. 2
"Cabbage" - another remade version from Golden Hits of the Smothers Brothers, Vol. 2
"Michael, Row Your Boat Ashore" - another remade version from Golden Hits of the Smothers Brothers, Vol. 2
"You Didn't Come In" ("I Talk to the Trees") - originally released on Smothers Brothers Comedy Hour
"Tommy's Song" - Not listed among the tracks, as it immediately follows "You Didn't Come In" from The Smothers Brothers Comedy Hour album and is included as part of that track

Personnel
Dick Smothers – vocals, double bass
Tom Smothers – vocals, guitar

External links
Complete  Smothers Brothers' discography can be found here.

1988 greatest hits albums
Smothers Brothers albums
Rhino Records compilation albums
Albums produced by David Carroll (musician)